The Mark of Zorro may refer to:

The distinctive mark left by the fictional character Zorro 
The Curse of Capistrano, a 1919 novel by Johnston McCulley that was re-published as The Mark of Zorro in 1924
The Mark of Zorro (1920 film), a silent film starring Douglas Fairbanks
The Mark of Zorro (1940 film), a film starring Tyrone Power
The Mark of Zorro (1974 film), a television movie starring Frank Langella
The Mark of Zorro (La marque de Zorro), a 1975 French film starring Clint Douglas; see 
Mark of Zorro (1975 film), a 1975 Italian film starring George Hilton
The Mark of Zorro, a 1997 radio drama produced by BBC; see 
The Mark of Zorro, a 2011 radio drama produced by Hollywood Theater of the Ear for Blackstone Audio; see

See also
The Mask of Zorro, a 1998 film starring Anthony Hopkins and Antonio Banderas